Shallow Water is the debut album by Servant, and also served to launch the new label Tunesmith Records in 1979. The gatefold jacket opened to reveal a photo of the cover scene (people, furniture and all) being washed away in the tide. The album was originally issued in Canada on red vinyl, but later pressings were in standard black.

In 2006, Shallow Water was reissued on CD by Retroactive Records.

Track listing

Credits 
Musicians
 Bruce Wright: Lead guitar, piano, synthesizer & vocals
 Owen Brock: Rhythm guitar & vocals
 Sandie Brock: Lead vocals, piano, synthesizer & congas
 Bob Hardy: Lead vocals & percussion
 Rob Martens: Bass guitar & vocals
 David Holmes: Drums & vocals

Production
 Producer: Bob Brooks
 Engineer: Bob Rock
 Assistant Engineer: Pat Glover (credited on reissue to Mike Fraser)
 Studio: Little Mountain Sound Studios
 Album cover concept: Owen Brock & Jim Palosaari
 Reissue Executive Producer: Matthew Hunt

Notes

References

External links

1979 debut albums
Servant (band) albums